Tiger Standard may refer to:
 Singapore Tiger Standard, Singapore newspaper published in English language
 Hongkong Tiger Standard, Hong Kong newspaper published in English language